Target Unknown (also known as Prisoner of War) is a 1951 American war film directed by George Sherman and starring Mark Stevens, Alex Nicol and Robert Douglas. An American bomber crew are forced to bail out over Occupied France in 1944 and are captured by the Germans, who subject them to strenuous interrogation. The film begins with a written foreword that reads: "In the making of this picture, the cooperation of the Department of Defense and the United States Air Force is gratefully acknowledged."

Plot
In 1944 at a United States Army Air Forces air base in England, Capt. James M. "Steve" Stevens and his Martin B-26 Marauder bomber crew are assigned to a second bombing mission of the day. The men are exhausted both physically and emotionally because the squadron has been repeatedly attacked by the enemy, possibly because someone has leaked information about the raids. The men have been warned that the Germans employ clever and insidious methods of extracting vital information from downed flyers.

Over their target, their bomber is attacked and bombardier Russ Johnson is killed. The rest of the crew, Steve, co-pilot Sgt. Frank Crawford and gunners Sgt. Alfred Mitchell and Sgt. Ralph G. Phelps, who is wounded, are forced to parachute out of the aircraft.

Steve and Al find each other on the ground but are promptly captured by German soldiers and brought to a holding area to prepare them for a prisoner-of-war camp. There, they are greeted by a Red Cross representative, but Steve notices that the form asks for excessive information and both Americans refuse to complete it.

Nazi intelligence officer Col. Von Broeck discovers clues to their personalities, including Steve's intelligence and Al's loyalty to Steve. Intelligence officer Capt. Fred Reiner, an American, visits Lt. Webster, another prisoner, and by lying that he is an Allied sympathizer, Reiner has Webster reveal that Ralph is from Atlanta.

A beautiful German nurse tends to the wounded Ralph, convincing him to fill out the fake Red Cross form and divulge that two new crews were recently added to the squadron. With this information, Von Broeck surmises that the Americans are planning a large bombing raid, so he pretends that he will kill Steve unless Al divulges more information about the raid. As the raid is top secret, Al only reveals the type of bombs to be used. After the fake firing squad, Von Broeck deduces that the target must be one of four French cities. Reiner interrogates Frank, who has been beaten by the Gestapo and brought to the intelligence station, and quickly discovers that from his list of possible targets it is the town of Cambrai, where the Axis gasoline supply is stored.

Al's cellmate overhears him bragging about what the Nazis have learned. When the crew is reunited and about to be shipped out by train, a plan is hatched. With Al and Frank on the train, Steve and Al jump off the train but Frank is shot and killed by a guard.

Steve and Al walk all night and come upon a French farmer whose kind daughter sneaks them into the nearest city, outfits them in peasant clothing and finds them a ride to a town near Cambrai that harbors French underground agents. Their driver Jean informs them that the gasoline supply at Cambrai has been moved to another location.

The Americans find an underground bar, where an agent slips Al fake identification papers, but a singer tips off the Germans. Al is arrested, but Steve escapes with the help of the agent and brought to the underground headquarters, where he finally convinces the leader to send a warning to the Allies. As night falls, Steve and the leader see the American squadron flying away from Cambrai and realize that the raid will succeed.

Main cast

 Mark Stevens as Capt. Jerome "Steve" Stevens  
 Alex Nicol as Sgt. Alfred Mitchell  
 Robert Douglas as Col. von Broeck  
 Don Taylor as Lt. Frank Webster  
 Gig Young as Capt. Reiner  
 Joyce Holden as German nurse  
 Suzanne Dalbert as Theresa  
 Malú Gatica as French entertainer  
 James Best as Sgt. Ralph Phelps  
 Richard Carlyle as Brooklyn  
 Steven Geray as Jean  
 Johnny Sands as Sgt. Frank Crawford  
 Tony Christian as Gundlach  
 James Young as Russ Johnson

Production
In 1950, the film story of Resisting Enemy Interrogation (1944) was purchased from screenwriter Harold Medford to be made in a Universal-International motion picture with a working title of Prisoner of War.

The film is based on Medford's screenplay, but its climax was changed to involve the prisoners' escape. Principal photography took place from early September to early October 1950.

Reception
The Daily Variety review noted that Target Unknown featured: "... actual methods employed by Germans." According to a contemporary The New York Times review, the film contains footage from an actual 1944 bombing raid over France.

The film's world premiere took place in Baltimore, Maryland on February 8, 1951 and was attended by Air Force pilot Robert J. Locke, the only POW to have escaped after having been shot down and imprisoned behind North Korean enemy lines.

References

Notes

Citations

Bibliography

 Stephens, Michael L. Art Directors in Cinema: A Worldwide Biographical Dictionary. Jefferson, North Carolina: McFarland & Company, 1998. .

External links
 
 

1951 films
1951 war films
1950s English-language films
American aviation films
Films about the United States Army Air Forces
American war films
Films directed by George Sherman
Universal Pictures films
Films set in France
Films set in 1944
American black-and-white films
1950s American films